Jing Yuexiu, 井岳秀, (September 6, 1878 – February 1, 1936) was a warlord from Shaanxi during the Warlord Era. He was born in what is now Tongchuan, Shaanxi on September 6, 1878.  His whole life was spent in the army, and ruled Shaanxi from the city of Yulin for 23 years. He was called "榆林王" or "the Yulin king" because of his major base at Yulin, though he was much more powerful and actually controlled most of Shaanxi for most of his reign.  He died of an accidental self-inflicted gunshot wound February 1, 1936.

External links

Republic of China warlords from Shaanxi
1878 births
1936 deaths
Politicians from Tongchuan
Firearm accident victims
Deaths by firearm in China
Accidental deaths in China